Little Linford is a village in the City of Milton Keynes, Buckinghamshire, England. It is about a mile west of Newport Pagnell, near the M1 motorway.  The village is separated from its neighbour and namesake Great Linford (and the rest of the Milton Keynes urban area) by the floodplain of the River Great Ouse.

Little Linford was initially a hamlet in the manor and ecclesiastical parish of Linford.  The parish church is dedicated to St Leonard.

The traditional parish name 'Linford' is an Old English language word that  means 'ford where maple trees grow'.  In the Domesday Book of 1086 the village was recorded as Linforde.  The prefix 'Little' was added to distinguish it from Great Linford.

Civil parish
Little Linford is in the civil parish of "Haversham-cum-Little Linford", which also includes the nearby village of Haversham. The parish had a population of 873 according to the 2011 census. This merged parish was formed in 1934.

Little Linford Wood
Little Linford Wood is owned by Berkshire, Buckinghamshire and Oxfordshire Wildlife Trust.  Today it is one of the best habitats for dormice, which were transferred to Little Linford Wood from Kent when the Channel Tunnel rail link was being constructed.

References

External links

Villages in Buckinghamshire
Areas of Milton Keynes